The Abylidae are a family of marine invertebrates in the order Siphonophorae. They are colonial, but the colonies can superficially resemble jellyfish; although they appear to be a single organism, each specimen is actually a colony of Siphonophora.

It contains the following taxa:
 Subfamily Abylinae L. Agassiz, 1862
 Genus Abyla Quoy & Gaimard, 1827
 Abyla bicarinata Moser, 1925
 Abyla haeckeli Lens & van Reimsdijk, 1908
 Abyla trigona Quoy & Gaimard, 1827
 Genus Ceratocymba Chun, 1888
 Ceratocymba dentata (Bigelow, 1918)
 Ceratocymba leuckarti (Huxley, 1859)
 Ceratocymba sagittata Quoy & Gaimard, 1827
 Subfamily Abylopsinae Totton, 1954
 Genus Abylopsis Chun, 1888
 Abylopsis eschscholtzi Huxley, 1859
 Abylopsis tetragona Otto, 1823
 Genus Bassia L. Agassiz, 1862
 Bassia bassensis Quoy & Gaimard, 1827
 Genus Enneagonum Quoy & Gaimard, 1827
 Enneagonum hyalinum Quoy & Gaimard, 1827

References

 
Calycophorae
Cnidarian families